Central Park, constructed by the Jaipur Development Authority is the largest park in Jaipur, India. It is located, as its name suggests, in the centre of Jaipur city. Having a big lush green beautiful garden and Rambagh Polo Ground and golf club nearby makes it an enjoyable place in Jaipur.

A number of migratory and native birds visit the park during the year.

It is the largest tricolour in the country.

A musical fountain, a temple and stone statues are some of the attractions in the park.

References

Parks in Jaipur